Inyala is an administrative ward in the Mbeya Rural district of the Mbeya Region of Tanzania. In 2016 the Tanzania National Bureau of Statistics report there were 11,621 people in the ward, from 10,544 in 2012.

Villages and hamlets 
The ward has 7 villages, and 35 hamlets.

 Inyala
 Hamwenje
 Hamwenje B
 Inyala
 Kolya
 Relini
 Sisiyunje
 Tuyombo
 Shamwengo
 Ipogoro
 Itondwe
 Myela
 Utulivu
 Imezu
 Inzawa
 Isanga
 Magoye
 Masementi
 Masyeto
 Sawa
 Iyawaya
 Galiaya B
 Galilaya
 Kijiweni
 Madizini
 Vijana
 Makwenje
 Ibohola
 Makwenje
 Makwenje B
 Mlowo
 Mlowo B
 Syite
 Darajani
 Darajani
 Iduda
 Iganjo
 Imezu Mjini
 Iwanga
 Mwashoma
 Inolo
 Mwashoma

References 

Wards of Mbeya Region